Thomas "Tom" Wansey (born 12 December 1986 in Oxford) is a British television actor who most notably played the character of Mark Hollander in the children's TV show Ace Lightning.

Filmography
 Tilly Trotter (1999)
 Tales of Uplift and Moral Improvement (2001)
 Murder Rooms: The White Knight Stratagem (2001)
 Ace Lightning (2002–2004)
 Goodbye, Mr. Chips (2002)
 Keen Eddie (2004)
 Casualty (2004)
 The Giblet Boys (2005)

External links

English male television actors
1986 births
Living people